The Cambridge Low-Frequency Synthesis Telescope (CLFST) is an east-west aperture synthesis radio telescope currently operating at 151 MHz. It consists of 60 tracking yagis on a 4.6 km baseline, giving 776 simultaneous baselines. These provide a resolution of 70×70 cosec (declination) arcsec2, with a sensitivity of about 30 to 50 mJy/beam, and a field of view of about 9°×9°. The telescope is situated at the Mullard Radio Astronomy Observatory.

The CLFST has made three astronomical catalogues of the Northern Hemisphere:
 6C survey at 151 MHz
 7C survey at 151 MHz
 8C survey at 38 MHz

Radio telescopes
Interferometric telescopes
Cavendish Laboratory